Campbell J. Miller is a judge serving on the Tax Court of Canada since 2001.

References

Living people
Judges of the Tax Court of Canada
Year of birth missing (living people)